Hirschfield is a surname. Notable people with the surname include:

 Alan Hirschfield, American film studio executive and philanthropist
 Brad Hirschfield (born 1963), American Orthodox rabbi
 Jeffrey Hirschfield, Canadian television writer
 Trevor Hirschfield, wheelchair rugby player
Magnus Hirschfield, German physician and sexologist

See also
 Hirschfeld (disambiguation)
 Hirshfield (surname)